Robert Mack Bell (born July 6, 1943) is an American lawyer and jurist from Baltimore, Maryland. From 1996 to 2013, he served as Chief Judge on the Maryland Court of Appeals, the highest court in the state. He was the first African American to hold the position.

At 16 years old, Bell was the lead plaintiff in Bell v. Maryland, a case that ultimately helped push the U.S. toward desegregation. Bell served as a judge at every level of the Maryland court system; and on July 6, 2013, reached the state's mandatory retirement age of 70 years for appellate and circuit court judges.

Background

Born in Rocky Mount, North Carolina, Bell's mother, a sharecropper, moved him and his two brothers to East Baltimore when he was one and a half years old. He attended Dunbar High School with classmate and friend Reginald F. Lewis. As a 16-year-old, he and a group of students participated in a sit-in to protest racial segregation at a local restaurant. On June 17, 1960, the group of 12 students entered Hooper's Restaurant, formerly located at Charles and Fayette Streets in downtown Baltimore, where they were refused service and asked to leave. The students, including Bell, refused. He and the other students were arrested and convicted in the Circuit Court of Baltimore City for criminal trespassing, and fined $10. The NAACP hired a team of lawyers, including Thurgood Marshall and Juanita Jackson Mitchell, to represent the students and appeal the conviction to the Maryland Court of Appeals. The appellants argued that the use of the state's trespassing laws to support segregation of public accommodations violated the Fourteenth Amendment to the United States Constitution. In 1962, the Court of Appeals upheld the decision of the circuit court.

The case was then appealed to the U.S Supreme Court, where Bell was represented by Constance Baker Motley and Jack Greenberg. In Bell v. Maryland (1964), the Supreme Court, noting that in the period since the students' conviction the Maryland General Assembly passed public accommodation laws and Congress passed the Civil Rights Act of 1964, refused to rule whether the state's trespassing laws could be used to exclude blacks from public accommodations. The Court vacated the decision and remanded the case to allow the state court to rule whether the conviction should be reversed due to the change in state law. On April 9, 1965, Bell's conviction was reversed by the state Court of Appeals and all of the students were cleared of all charges. The decision of the Supreme Court came just two days after the Senate ended a filibuster and passed the Civil Rights Act. It has been suggested that the Supreme Court refrained from reaching the merits of the case in consideration of the pending civil rights legislation, as had it done so, it would have eliminated the basis for passing the Act.

Bell later attended and graduated with a Bachelor of Arts in history from Morgan State University in Baltimore in 1966 and while there became a brother in Alpha Phi Omega. He then was admitted to Harvard Law School where he earned his Juris Doctor in 1969. That same year he was admitted to the bar and began his legal practice in Baltimore.

Judicial career

In 1975, Bell was appointed to the District Court of Maryland, District 1, in Baltimore City and served there until 1980. He was an Associate Judge, Baltimore City Circuit Court, 8th Judicial Circuit, from 1980 to 1984 when he was appointed to the Maryland Court of Special Appeals. Seven years later he was appointed to the state's highest court and became the chief judge in 1996. He was a member, Court of Appeals Standing Committee on Rules of Practice and Procedure from 1977 to 1982; Commission to Revise the Annotated Code of Maryland, 1980–82; and the Board of Directors, Judicial Institute of Maryland, 1982–84. In August 2006, Bell was named Chair of the National Center for State Courts’ Board of Directors. At the same time, Judge Bell also was named president of the Conference of Chief Justices.

In April 2013, Bell announced that he would be retiring on July 6, 2013. After reaching Maryland's mandatory retirement age for state judges, 70, Bell retired from his position as Chief Judge of the Maryland Court of Appeals on July 6, 2013.

Awards

Bell has also been the recipient of several awards:
American Bar Association D'Alemberte-Raven Award for Outstanding Leadership in Alternative Dispute Resolution
Legal Excellence Award for Advancement of Public Service Responsibility from the Maryland Bar Foundation
Maryland Network Against Domestic Violence Special Recognition Award
Maryland Leadership in Law Award
Maryland Legal Services Corporation Medal for Access to Justice

See also
List of African-American jurists
List of first minority male lawyers and judges in Maryland

Notes

External links
Bell's profile at the Maryland State Archives

1943 births
Living people
20th-century American judges
21st-century American judges
African-American judges
African-American lawyers
Chief Judges of the Maryland Court of Appeals
Harvard Law School alumni
Maryland lawyers
Morgan State University alumni
People from Rocky Mount, North Carolina
20th-century African-American people
21st-century African-American people